The Derby d'Italia (English: Derby of Italy) is the name of the football derby between Internazionale of Milan and Juventus of Turin. The term was coined back in 1967 by Italian sports journalist Gianni Brera. It is the equivalent of Spain's El Clásico and France's Le Classique.

The teams are from the two biggest cities in Northern Italy. 
Both teams have fans across Italy, and there are numerous fan clubs of Juventus in Lombardy and Inter in Piedmont (including in the two cities).

History
The matchup between Juventus and Inter is perhaps the most intense match in Italy between two teams from different cities, historically since the 50s and 60s, and especially after the Calciopoli which saw Juventus stripped of their league title from 2005–06 and given to Inter.

After a field invasion due to the overflowing stands during a derby fixture in the 1960–61 season, Lega Calcio awarded the match to Inter but later overturned the decision and ordered a replay, much to the fury of Inter president Angelo Moratti and club supporters. Moratti accused the Italian football association of favouritism due to the Agnelli family's influence, as Umberto Agnelli was FIGC president at that time, although the competition was ruled by Lega Calcio since 1946. In protest, Inter fielded their youth players for the replay and were thrashed 9–1. Juventus striker Omar Sívori scored six goals in the match and went on to win the Ballon d'Or that year.

During the 1997–98 fixture at the Stadio delle Alpi, after that in the first leg there were controversies for a penalty not given to Juventus, on the 0–0 result and consequent Inter victory (1–0), there was controversy over referee Piero Ceccarini's decision not to award a penalty for Mark Iuliano's foul on Inter forward Ronaldo. Juventus, up 1–0 at the time of the incident, were after few seconds awarded a penalty which was missed by Alessandro Del Piero; Juventus won the game 1–0 and with this secured the scudetto with five points ahead. The incident caused heated arguments in the Italian parliament during a publicly broadcast "question time" session in April 1998. Domenico Gramazio of the National Alliance reportedly shouted "They are all thieves!" at fellow politician and former Juventus player Massimo Mauro of the ruling Democrats of the Left, prompting Chamber of Deputies member and then-Deputy Prime Minister Walter Veltroni to comment, "We are not at a stadium. This is a spectacle that is unworthy, embarrassing and grotesque...". The session had to be suspended and several politicians were later penalised as a result.

During the days leading up to the derby on 5 December 2009 in Turin, there were fears about the Juventus ultras abusing Inter's Italian striker Mario Balotelli (who is of Ghanaian descent) due to a history of racial abuse from fans. Juventus chairman Jean-Claude Blanc and Mirella Scirea, widow of Juventus legend Gaetano Scirea, wrote to the ultra groups and publicly urged fans to refrain from using racist chants. When Inter's players arrived in Turin, the team bus was pelted with eggs by some Juventus fans. The match itself was marred by seven bookings, a red card and a number of heated on-pitch altercations, in particular between Juve goalkeeper Gianluigi Buffon and Inter midfielder Thiago Motta. Inter manager José Mourinho was dismissed in the first half for arguing with the referee. A second-half winner from Claudio Marchisio re-opened the Scudetto race as Inter's lead was cut to five points.

Juventus and Inter were matched up for the semi-final of the 2015–16 Coppa Italia, where Juventus won the opening leg 3–0 at home in Turin on 27 January 2016. In the return leg on 3 March 2016, Inter won 3–0 in Milan at home to tie 3–3 on aggregate and force a penalty shoot-out, which Juventus ultimately won 5–3 to move on to the final.

Official match results 
Dates are in dd/mm/yyyy form.
 SF = Semi-finals
 QF = Quarter-finals
 R16 = Round of 16
 R32 = Round of 32
 GS = Group stage
 R1 = Round 1
 R2 = Round 2

Statistics

Records

Most goals in a match 
 10 goals on 10 June 1961, Juventus 9–1 Inter
 9 goals on 14 December 1913, Juventus 7–2 Inter
 8 goals on 19 June 1975, Inter 2–6 Juventus
 8 goals on 23 October 1943, Inter 6–2 Juventus

Internazionale biggest wins 
* Four or more goals difference, OR Inter scored five or above
 Inter 6–1 Juventus on 26 November 1911
 Inter 6–3 Juventus on 4 January 1913
 Inter 6–0 Juventus on 17 November 1935
 Inter 4–0 Juventus on 17 September 1939
 Inter 6–0 Juventus on 4 April 1954
 Inter 4–0 Juventus on 11 November 1979
 Inter 4–0 Juventus on 11 November 1984

Juventus biggest wins 
* Four or more goals difference, OR Juventus scored five or above
 Juventus 7–2 Inter on 14 December 1913
 Juventus 6–2 Inter on 17 January 1932
 Juventus 4–0 Inter on 17 May 1942
 Juventus 9–1 Inter on 10 June 1961
 Inter 2–6 Juventus on 19 June 1975 in Coppa Italia

Top scorers
Below is the list of players who have scored at least four goals in official meetings.

Trophies

Head-to-head ranking in Serie A (1930–2022)

• Total: Juventus with 55 higher finishes, Inter with 35 higher finishes (as of the end of the 2021–22 season).

Nota bene: Due to the Calciopoli scandal, Juventus' 2004–05 title was voided, while in the 2005–06 season Juventus was relegated and the title was awarded to Inter.

References

External links
Inter archive

Italia
D
Juventus F.C.
Football in Turin
Football in Milan